Arthrochilus rosulatus, commonly known as rosetted elbow orchid, is a flowering plant in the orchid family (Orchidaceae) and is endemic to Tropical North Queensland. It has a rosette of bluish green leaves surrounding its base and up to fifteen pale green, insect-like flowers with dark red glands on its labellum.

Description
Arthrochilus rosulatus is a terrestrial, perennial, deciduous, sympodial herb with an underground tuber that produces daughter tubers on the end of root-like stolons. The lateral sepals and petals are turned back against the ovary. The column is translucent with a few purplish spots, curved, and has two pairs of curved wings. Flowering occurs from November to July.

Taxonomy and naming
Arthrochilus rosulatus was first formally described in 1991 by David Jones from a specimen collected near Rossville. The description was published in Australian Orchid Research. The specific epithet (rosulatus) is a Latin word meaning "of roses", referring to the leaf rosette surrounding the base of the flowering stem, contrasting with others in the genus that have them on side growth.

Distribution and habitat
The rosetted elbow orchid grows in forest in the vicinity of Cooktown, sometimes forming spreading colonies.

Ecology
As with other Arthrochilus orchids, A. rosulatus is pollinated by male thynnid wasps of the genus Arthrothynnus although the species involved is not known. It also reproduces asexually by producing new tubers.

References 

rosulatus
Plants described in 1991
Orchids of New South Wales
Orchids of Queensland